A helicopter carrier is a type of aircraft carrier whose primary purpose is to operate helicopters, and has a large flight deck that occupies a substantial part of the deck, which can extend the full length of the ship like  of the Royal Navy (RN), or extend only partway, usually aft, as in the Soviet Navy's  or in the Chinese Navy's Type 0891A. It often also has a hangar deck for the storage of aircraft.

Pure helicopter carriers are difficult to define in the 21st century. The advent of STOVL aircraft such as the Harrier jump jet, and now the F-35, have complicated the classification; the United States Navy's , for instance, carries six to eight Harriers as well as over 20 helicopters. Only smaller carriers unable to operate the Harrier and older pre-Harrier-era carriers can be regarded as true helicopter carriers. In many cases, other carriers, able to operate STOVL aircraft, are classified as "light aircraft carriers". Other vessels, such as the Wasp class, are also capable of embarking troops such as marines and landing them ashore; they are classified as amphibious assault ships.

Helicopter carriers have been used as anti-submarine warfare carriers and amphibious assault ships.

 and two of her sisters were 22,000 ton fleet carriers converted to "commando carriers" only able to operate helicopters. Hermes was later converted to a STOVL carrier.

Helicopter carriers by country

Helicopter carriers

Helicopter carriers currently in use

Retired helicopter carriers

   (Royal Navy) – helicopter carrier of the 1960s–1980s
   (Italian Navy) – an  helicopter cruiser active from 1964 to 1992
   (United States Navy) –  landing helicopter dock, active 1998–2020
   (Royal Navy) – helicopter carrier of the 1960s–1980s
   (Italian Navy) - an Andrea Doria-class helicopter cruiser active from 1964 to 1989
   (US Coast Guard), decommissioned in 1946 – world's first helicopter carrier.
   (Royal Navy) – an  light aircraft carrier, which operated as a helicopter carrier when HMS Ocean was being refitted.
   (United States Navy) – lead of the seven-ship , active from the early 1960s to the early 2000s
   (French Navy), decommissioned in 2010
   (Soviet Navy) – second of the two-ship  - active 1969–1991
   (Soviet Navy) – lead of the two-ship Moskva class, active 1967–1991
  ex- (Royal Navy) – helicopter carrier 1998–2018, decommissioned March 2018.
Sold to Brazil in February 2018, renamed Atlântico
   (Italian Navy) – a helicopter cruiser active from 1969 to 2003

See also
 Amphibious transport dock
 Amphibious warfare ship
 Aviation-capable naval vessel
 Landing helicopter assault
 Landing platform helicopter
 List of STOVL carriers

References

External links

Aircraft carriers
Aircraft carriers by type